Moa Iwano (岩野桃亜 Iwano Moa, born March 20, 2004) is a Japanese figure skater. She is a 4-time medalist at Japanese Novice Championships and won 2 bronze medals in the Novice category of the Asian Figure Skating Trophy.

Career

Early years 
Iwano was born in Seoul and lived there until she and her family moved to Kobe when she was 7. She can speak fluent Korean. 

Iwano began skating when she was 3. Her skating idols are Yuna Kim, Mao Asada, Daisuke Takahashi and Javier Fernández.

She trained daily with coach Mie Hamada's pupils, including World silver medalist and Japan's 4-time national champion Satoko Miyahara.

2015-2016 season 
Iwano captured the bronze medal in the Novice category at the Asian Open Trophy in Bangkok, Thailand, in August.

2016-2017 season 
Iwano earned the bronze medal in the Novice category at the Asian Open Trophy in Manila, Philippines in August.

Iwano won the Novice title at the Bavarian Open in Oberstdorf, Germany in February.

2017-2018 season 
Iwano debuted on the ISU Junior Grand Prix (JGP) circuit in the 2017-2018 season. She finished 6th overall at the JGP event in Salzburg, Austria.

2019-2020 season 
In the 2019-20 season, Iwano was assigned to JGP Poland. She finished in 9th place in Gdańsk after falling prone to several underrotations in both programs. At the 2019-20 Japan Junior championships, Iwano placed 8th.

2020-2021 season 
In July 2020, Iwano announced that she would make her senior debut in domestic competitions during the 2020-21 season.  At the Kinki Regional Championships in October, Iwano finished in 10th place and was therefore not eligible to compete in the Western Section Championships (Top 9 advance).

Programs

Competitive highlights 
JGP: Junior Grand Prix

References 

2004 births
Living people
Japanese female single skaters
Sportspeople from Kobe